Tiwi was an electoral division of the Legislative Assembly in Australia's Northern Territory. One of the Legislative Assembly's original electorates, it was first contested at the 1974 election, and existed until 1983. It was named after the Tiwi Islands.

Members for Tiwi

Election results

Elections in the 1970s

 Preferences were not distributed.
 The number of votes each individual Independent received is unknown.

 The number of votes each individual Independent, Labor and CLP candidate received is unknown.
 The Labor candidate that came second on preferences is unknown.

Elections in the 1980s

 Preferences were not distributed.

References

Former electoral divisions of the Northern Territory